Willard Eben Mains (July 7, 1868 – May 23, 1923) was an American professional baseball pitcher. After that season, he did not return to the majors until , when he pitched in 30 games, starting 23 of them, for the Cincinnati Kelly's Killers of the American Association. He had a record of 12–12 with 20 complete games before he moved on and pitched two games for the Milwaukee Brewers, also of the Association. He was not seen in the major leagues again until five years later when he surfaced for the  Boston Beaneaters, with whom he pitched in eight games, winning three and losing two. His son Jim Mains pitched one game in the majors for the  Philadelphia Athletics.

Willard Mains had a long career in minor league baseball, where he had a record of 318 wins and 179 losses in 545 games. He died at the age of 54 in Bridgton, Maine, and was interred at South High Street Cemetery in Bridgton.

References

External links

1868 births
1923 deaths
19th-century baseball players
Major League Baseball pitchers
Chicago White Stockings players
Cincinnati Kelly's Killers players
Milwaukee Brewers (AA) players
Boston Beaneaters players
Portland (minor league baseball) players
Davenport (minor league baseball) players
St. Paul Apostles players
Portland Webfeet players
Lewiston (minor league baseball) players
Bangor Millionaires players
Springfield Ponies players
Springfield Maroons players
Toronto Canucks players
Buffalo Bisons (minor league) players
Taunton Herrings players
Rome Romans players
Syracuse Stars (minor league baseball) players
Baseball players from Maine
People from Windham, Maine
People from Bridgton, Maine